Eugenio Morales Agacino (March 15, 1914 – March 9, 2002) was a Spanish entomologist and naturalist, named honorary doctorate by the Autonomous University of Madrid.

External links

1914 births
2002 deaths
Spanish entomologists
20th-century Spanish zoologists